General elections were held in Jordan on 20 September 2016 to elect the 18th House of Representatives. The elections were announced after parliament was dissolved by King Abdullah II on 29 May 2016, with the King appointing Hani Mulki as interim Prime Minister following the resignation of Abdullah Ensour.

Following electoral reforms announced in 2015, the elections were the first since 1989 to be held primarily under a form of proportional representation; intervening elections had been held under the single non-transferable vote system, which systematically disadvantaged Islamist political parties, and had been introduced after they won 22 of the 80 seats in the 1989 elections. The reforms led to opposition parties deciding to contest the elections, including the Islamic Action Front (IAF), the political arm of the Muslim Brotherhood, which had boycotted several previous elections, including in 2010 and 2013. Splits in the Muslim Brotherhood before the elections led to the defection of hundreds of Muslim Brotherhood figures to form a new, supposedly more moderate party.

The IAF contested the elections as part of the National Coalition for Reform (NCR) alliance, which included Christians, Circassians and women. Despite being expected to win 20–30 seats, the alliance won only 15 seats, of which 10 were IAF members. The secular Ma'an list won two seats in Amman's third district, gaining parliamentary representation for the first time. Women made historic gains, with 20 of 130 elected members being female, an increase from 18 of the 150 seats available in the 2013 elections. Voter turnout was reported to be 37%, lower than previous elections and attributed to the inability of Jordanian expatriates (around one million) to vote due to the new electoral law. The elections were regarded as fair and transparent by international observers, though Jordanian elections are often marred by significant deficiencies, such as a bias towards candidates loyal to the monarchy and other elites.

Timetable

Electoral system
The Parliament of Jordan consists of two chambers, an upper Senate appointed by the King, and a lower Chamber of Deputies elected through popular vote. These share equal legislative responsibility. The King appoints the Prime Minister and Cabinet from the lower house, and also hold wide legislative and executive powers. After parliament is dissolved, the constitution mandates elections be held within four months, although the King may delay elections or suspend parliament and rule by decree. The government can be dismissed by a two-thirds vote of no confidence by the Chamber of Deputies.

The age of suffrage is 18. Those who are bankrupt or mentally disabled are not allowed to vote, and there have historically been no provisions to help absentee or special needs voters. Employees of the armed forces, state security services, public security services, Gendarmie, and Civil Defence forces cannot vote during their employment, and the right to vote is voided for some convicts.

Parliament has quotas for women, as well as for some ethnic and religious minorities. Women have 15 reserved seats, Christians have nine seats, and Circassians and Chechens share three. Bedouin tribes have their own electoral districts, and elect nine members of parliament, three of which overlap with the women's quota. While political parties do exist, they have historically been repressed, and for many decades the political system has been designed to weaken them. Political parties come under the jurisdiction of the Ministry of Interior, and may not be established on the basis of religion. They have low membership, with tribes playing roles traditionally associated with political parties. Elections are therefore often based on patronage. Politics mirrors the demographic split between those of Palestinian origin and those of East Bank origin. The state is dominated by East Bankers and they form the core of monarchical support, whereas Jordanian Palestinians had little political representation and were systematically discriminated against. Gerrymandered constituencies have meant elections often focus on local affairs rather than national ones.

Electoral reforms

Political parties were long suppressed in Jordan under martial law. An economic crash and resultant unrest led to political liberalisation in 1989. The 1989 elections were run using block voting, a system left over from the era of British rule. Political parties were banned, but independents were often affiliated with underground parties, and the results gave a majority to parties opposing the monarchy's political direction. Due to the 1989 election results, King Hussein changed the political system for the 1993 elections in order to suppress Islamist votes. The new system, which became known as “one-man one-vote”, disproportionately benefitted rural East Bank communities over urban and Palestinian communities. While political parties were legalised, the new system weakened them. This system was unpopular with many political parties, and subsequent elections held under this system faced boycotts by numerous groups, notably the Islamic Action Front.

Political grievances emerged alongside other causes of unrest during the 2011–12 Jordanian protests that occurred as part of the wider Arab Spring. King Abdullah moved to assuage the populace, promising reform and firing governments in quick succession, meaning that in the two years after the unrest began there were five Prime Ministers. Reform bodies were set up, and some substantial changes were made including the introduction of an Independent Election Committee (IEC), and the introduction of a mixed electoral system whereby 27 of the 150 elected seats would be determined through nationwide proportional representation. Most changes however were cosmetic at best, and political parties including the IAF boycotted the 2013 election.

In 2015 the government announced new reforms, promising an end to the one-man one-vote system. The proposed reforms were revealed on 31 August 2015. The new electoral system was very similar to the 1989 elections, in that it fully did away with one-man one-vote, reintroducing block voting for all seats. One major difference was that in addition to voting for individual candidates, voters will also have a single vote for a multi-member party list, an adaptation taken from the experiment with proportional representation in the 2013 elections. All candidates will run as members of lists, with open list PR used to determine all seats falling outside of quotas. For the Circassian/Chechen and Christian seats, the seat is given to the highest candidate from within those groups. The female quota seats however are assigned to women who would not otherwise be elected. Re-elections will be held in the case of ties. After minor changes in both houses, the new law was approved by the King on 13 March 2016. Parliament was dissolved on 29 May and the government of Abdullah Ensour resigned, with the King appointing Hani Al-Mulki as caretaker Prime Minister in the lead-up to the election. The IEC set 20 September 2016 as the date of the election shortly afterwards.

Electoral districts

There are 23 electoral districts; five in the Amman governorate, four in the Irbid governorate, two in the Zarqa governorate, one each for the other nine governorates, and three badia districts for Bedouins. The Circassian/Chechen and Christian quotas were included among seats assigned within the governorate districts. Of the nine seats for the Christian quota, two are in both the Balqa district and the Karak district, and there is one in each of the following: Irbid's 3rd district, the Ajloun district, Zarqa's 1st district, Amman's 3rd district, and the Madaba district. The three Circassian/Chechen seats are in Zarqa's 1st district, Amman's 3rd district, and Amman's 4th district. The female quota is divided so that there is one seat in each governorate, and one in each badia. While the division of population between districts remains imperfect, it was an improvement upon previous elections.

Administration
Like with the 2013 election, the 2016 election will be run by the IEC. The IEC has stated one of its aims for the 2016 election is the restoration of public faith in the electoral system. Candidates were required to register by 16 August. Campaign spending is capped by the IEC to 5 dinars per voter in a district for large urban districts.

This is the first election where special centres are to be provided for deaf and blind voters. Voter registration was automatic, carried out using lists provided to the IEC by the Civil Service and the Passport Division. Indelible ink will be compulsory for voters.

Campaign
The reforms led to fears that Palestinians and Islamists would increase their influence. In 2015 internal divisions emerged among the Muslim Brotherhood, with splinter groups encouraged by the government. One splinter group, known as the Muslim Brotherhood Association, registered itself as the official Muslim Brotherhood in Jordan, taking advantage of the fact that the Muslim Brotherhood was affiliated with its Egyptian founders rather than being registered as a Jordanian organisation.
The Muslim Brotherhood Association, which emphasises its Jordanian identity, was given official status in March 2015. Subsequent internal dissent among the original Muslim Brotherhood led to the resignation of hundreds of members. Two other splinter groups have also broken away from the Muslim Brotherhood. The Muslim Brotherhood Association leveraged its official status to launch lawsuits claiming ownership of Muslim Brotherhood property, and in April 2016 the lawsuits were decided in the favour of the Association, leading them to seizing control of a wide swathe of Muslim Brotherhood property. The government also prevented a celebration of the 70th anniversary of the founding of the Muslim Brotherhood.

Despite the original Muslim Brotherhood becoming illegal after the official recognition of their splinter group, the IAF remained legal as it was registered as a Jordanian organisation. After the announcement of election reform in 2015, the IAF reported that they found the changes to be positive reforms, especially the removal of one-man one-vote. Despite its internal splits, the IAF held an internal vote on whether to compete in the 2016 elections, and it reported 76% of its members supported participation, whereas 17% opposed participation without substantial limitations to the King's constitutional powers. The government wanted the IAF to compete in order to enhance the election's legitimacy in western eyes. This along with the fear of obscurity may have contributed to the IAF vote result, and it is thought that they may be attempting to emulate the gains of elected Islamist parties in Tunisia and Morocco who co-operated with their governments, while avoiding suppression similar to that occurring in Egypt.

After the vote, the IAF announced that it was ending its boycott and would compete, and that it was reaching out to other opposition parties to discuss campaigning. On 20 August it announced it would be running on 20 national lists in various electoral districts, all under the banner of the “National Coalition for Reform”. These lists are shared with representatives from other political parties and some tribes, including five Christians contesting the Christian seats, four candidates for the Circassian and Chechen seats, and 19 women.

Two Muslim Brotherhood-linked candidates, Hossam Messheh and Ali Abussokar, were disqualified from the elections for the offence of showing mourning for the death of the international terrorist, Abu Musab Al-Zarkawi. Ali Abusokkar was a member of the parliament in 2006 when he was expelled for visiting the mourning house of Al-Khalayleh tribe, the tribe that Al-Zarkawi hails from.

On 10 September, the deadline for withdrawal from the parliamentary race, the final number of candidates reached 1,252 in 226 lists. 18 candidates had withdrawn from the race, while 21 applications were rejected. The Jordan News Agency reported that "1,252 candidates comprised 920 Muslim males, 245 Muslim females, 58 Christian males, five Christian females, 22 Circassian and Chechen males and two Circassian and Chechen females."

Conduct

The Independent Electoral Commission sent invites to a number of Arab and foreign organizations to observe the election process. The European Union will take part in the observation of the election process  through a task force that has access to all poll related facilities, including police stations. IEC declared that this is a step to ensure fair and transparent elections.

International observers stated that the elections were organized "with integrity and in full transparency". Few violations were reported, and the committees presented recommendations for upcoming elections.

Results

Around 1.5 million Jordanians went to the polls on 20 September, a 37% voter turnout. Number of eligible voters numbered around 4.1 million, up from 2.3 million in 2013. Voter turnout is lower than the previous elections due to the new elections law, where Jordanian expatriates, numbered at 1 million, were not granted the ability to vote.

Five women managed to win outside the quota system, making the total of female parliamentarians 20 out of 130, a record for Jordan. The last elections held 18 women out of 150.

The elections witnessed the first emergence of a secular movement, the Ma'an list, which strongly advocated for a civil state. It received the most votes in Amman's third district. Two candidates from Ma'an were elected, alongside three Islamists, as they had won in the women and Circassian quotas of Amman's third district.

Aftermath
The reforms introduced in the 2016 general elections, led Freedom House to designate Jordan as "partly free" from "not free" in its Freedom in the World 2017 report. The report added that the change was "due to electoral law changes that led to somewhat fairer parliamentary elections."

References

Jordan
2016 in Jordan
Election and referendum articles with incomplete results
Elections in Jordan
September 2016 events in Asia